JoAnne S. Bass is a senior noncommissioned officer in the United States Air Force and the nineteenth Chief Master Sergeant of the Air Force. She became the Chief Master Sergeant of the Air Force, and the first female to hold the highest senior enlisted rank in any United States military branch, on August 14, 2020, having been selected for the position on June 19. She is also the first person of Asian-American descent to hold the highest senior enlisted position in the Air Force. At the time of her selection, she was the Second Air Force's Command Chief Master Sergeant at Keesler Air Force Base in Mississippi, which she had reported to in July 2018. Air Force News reported "incoming Air Force Chief of Staff Gen. CQ Brown said Bass brings skills, temperament and experience that the job requires and an outlook on leadership that meshes with his own", and that he "could not be more excited to work side-by-side with Chief Bass."

Early life
Bass is originally from Mililani, Oahu, Hawaii. Her mother is of Korean descent and her father is a retired United States Army warrant officer. Her family lived in many stateside and overseas locations.

Military career
Bass joined the United States Air Force in 1993, specializing in aviation resource management. Bass's first duty assignment was at Pope Air Force Base, near Fayetteville, North Carolina. Later she was assigned to the 17th Training Wing at Goodfellow Air Force Base, near San Angelo, Texas. In 2011, while assigned to Ramstein Air Base in Germany, she was selected as Noncommissioned Officer of the Year. She has participated in Operation Southern Watch, Operation Enduring Freedom, and Operation Iraqi Freedom.

Bass was promoted to chief master sergeant on August 1, 2013, and to chief master sergeant of the Air Force on August 14, 2020.

Education

Assignments
June 1993 – June 1996, Operations System Management Journeyman, 74th Fighter Squadron, Pope Air Force Base, North Carolina
June 1996 – July 1998, Range Scheduling Specialist, 43rd Operations Support Squadron, Pope Air Force Base, North Carolina
July 1998 – November 2000, Noncommissioned Officer in Charge, Current Operations Scheduler, 24th Special Tactics Squadron, Fort Bragg, North Carolina
November 2000 – March 2001, Current Operations Scheduler, 86th Operational Support Squadron, Ramstein Air Base, Germany
March 2001 – January 2004, Noncommissioned Officer in Charge, Special Airlift Operations, Air Mobility Operations Control Center, Ramstein Air Base, Germany
January 2004 – November 2005, Noncommissioned Officer in Charge, Host Aviation Resource Management, 86th Operational Support Squadron, Ramstein Air Base, Germany
November 2005 – August 2010, Superintendent, Host Aviation Resource Management, Group Career Field Functional Manager, (Data Masked)
August 2010 – September 2012, Superintendent, Host Aviation Resource Management and Superintendent, 86th Operations Support Squadron, Ramstein Air Base, Germany
September 2012 – May 2015, Superintendent, 86th Operations Group, Ramstein Air Base, Germany
May 2015 – September 2016, Command Chief Master Sergeant, 17th Training Wing, Goodfellow Air Force Base, Texas
September 2016 – July 2018, Chief, Air Force Enlisted Developmental Education, The Pentagon, Washington, D.C.
July 2018 – August 2020, Command Chief Master Sergeant, Second Air Force, Keesler Air Force Base, Mississippi
August 2020 – present, Chief Master Sergeant of the Air Force, The Pentagon, Washington, D.C.

Awards and decorations

Other achievements

References

American military personnel of Korean descent
Living people
Recipients of the Legion of Merit
Military personnel from Hawaii
People from Oahu
United States Air Force airmen
Year of birth missing (living people)
Chief Master Sergeants of the United States Air Force